The Leelkase or Lailkase or Lelkase (Hussein bin Abdirahman bin Is'mail bin Ibrahim al Jaberti) is a major subclan of the Tanade Darod clan. Leelkase or Lelkase Hussein bin Abdirahman bin Is'mail bin Ibrahim al Jaberti is a subclan of the Somali Darod clan. The term "Leelkase" is a Somali nickname, which translates as "farsighted, mindful, smart, very intelligent. It is one of the major Somali groups, with a vast traditional territory spanning 3 major regions of Somalia: Bari, Nugaal and Mudug. From Bosaso down to galdogob , theleelkase settle in what is literally considered to be the 'Horn of Africa'. They can also be found in Kismayo in southern Somalia. The tanade  Sultanates  was the first and most influential in Bari region as mentioned many Arab documents. and it was commercial center of various Communities Somalia and Middle East.

Clan tree
In the Northeast regions of Somalia, the World Bank shows the following clan tree:

 Daarood
 ||Boqor Tanade
  Leelkase Boqor Tanade
   Ali Leelkase
   1. Hashim Ali
    2. Musa Ali
     3. Mahamud Ali
   Maalismoge
        Fiqi Ismail
         Idiris Osman
           Muumin Adan : Major of Leelkase
 1. Maxamed Muumin : Major
 - Reer Faarah
 <> Reer Jirac
 <> Reer Egal Badhawe
 <> Reer Khayroow
 - Reer Ahmed
 - Reer Xaaji
 - Reer Hassan Huseen
 - Fiqi Hassan             
 2. Hassan Muumin
 3. Ali Muumin
 4. Hirsi Muumin 
             Mahamed Adan
             Sahuure

Here's a list of the Major Leelkase Subclans and their area's.

The "Korshe" and "Warodhaqo" in Ethiopia
The "Cali Sheikh" in Middle Shabeele
The "Aw-Salaat" in Lower Shabeele
The Jaamac Hassan Muumin in Buurhakaba (Mostly in their own town called "Hassan Muumin")
The [[Muumin Adan]] largely in Mudug(Goldogob, Gaalkacyo), & Lower Jubba (Kismaayo), Dudub
The "Rooble Hassan" in Garowe,Eyl,Boosaaso and Qardho
The "Mohamed Hassan"  Ree Xabbad in Dan-goronyo, Eyl Taleex and lower Jubba
The "Mahamed Adan" who lives in Garoowe only
The "Fiqi Ismail" in Gaalkacyo and Burtinle
The "Maalismogge" of Gaalkacyo
The "Ismail Ali" in "Qandala"
The "Suhurre" in Eyl Nugaal

The Musa Ali further divides into the prominent Mumin Aden clans of the Mudug Region and the Somali Region of Ethiopia, and Hassan Idiris Clan of the Nugaal, Sool and Bari regions and as well as the Fiqi Ismail of Mudug region.

The Mahamud Ali clans settle in the Bari region of North Eastern Somalia; particularly in Bandar Beyla district. Hashim Ali is divided into the Malismoge clans and settle in the Mudug region.
Gambayah (Somali: Gambayax, Arabicجمبيح) is a District in the Nugal region of Puntland state of Somalia. It lies approximately 50 km Northeast of the city of Garoowe. The town is populated by the Rooble Hassan subclan of Leelkase, and other Idiris Osman clans. The city has a population of approximately 800,060.

Nugaal-gibin (Somali: Nugaal gibin, Arabic: نوغال غبن) is a District in the Mudug region of Puntland state of Somalia. It lies approximately 40 km southeast of the city of Galdogob. The town is populated by the Xirsi Muumin subclan of Leelkase, and other Mumin Adan clans. The city has a population of approximately 600,000.

Population
As of 2005, the broader Galdogob District had a total population of 40,433 residents mostly Leelkase 33,366 of inhabitants were urban and 57,067 were non-urban. Bayla has a population of around 16,700 inhabitants. The broader Bayla District has a total population of 14,376 residents. Bayla is primarily inhabited by people from the Somali ethnic group, with the Majeerteen and Leelkase Darod well-represented. The broader Garowe District has an estimated total population of 190,000 residents. As with most of Puntland, it is primarily inhabited by Somalis from the Harti Darod clan confederation, in particular the Majerteen and leelkase Darood clans. The Leelkase are also dominant in parts of Garsoor, a neighborhood of Galkayo with an estimated population of 137,667 inhabitants.

History
Somalia is inhabited by five major ethnic clans and one minor ethnic clan. The five major clans are the Darod, Dir, Hawiye, Isaaq, Rahanweyn and the minor clan called is the Ashraaf. The major clans within Darod are Ogaden, Dhulbahante, Jidwag, Leelkase, Majeerteen, Marehan, Warsangali, Awrtable, Dishiishe, and Mora'ase. Darod is the largest clan because they operate in almost all parts of the north. Within the Dir clan is the Issa, Gadabuursi, Surre, and  Biimaal. These clans make up the area known as “Greater Somalia” (Kenya, Ethiopia, Dijibouti, Somalia).
Leelkase is a sub-clan of the Tanade, one of the oldest Darod clans, and one of the oldest kingdoms in Somalia, according to Arab and world history, reached in 1775, after heavy fighting and the collapse of the Tanade Darood. 

The Leelkase sub-clan resides in Galdogob, Galkayo, Bander Beyla, Eyl, Garowe, and the Lower Juba, Bay, and Western Somali regions. The Leelkase community is described as a religious community, good neighbor, peace loving, and always caring for its neighbors. The Leelkase clan have received the nickname;"Darbi Darod"("The wall of Darod"), which tells about the defence, from the Hawiye clan, in the Hawiye-Darood war. It is a large clan scattered throughout all regions of Somalia such as Mudug, Nugal, Bari, Sool, Lower Juba, Middle Juba, Bay and Western Somalia. It is mainly inhabited by the Karkar community: Caris, Ceel, Dhidir, Buurbuur iyo Arindheer.

The Leelkase are mostly found in the Mudugh region in south-central Somalia. Although the Leelkase and the Majerteen are both from the Darod clan, "relations between them have not been great for a long time and they have fought each other a couple of times." Warm relations have been rare between the two groups. There are Leelkase in the Bari and Nugal regions. Relations between the two groups in that region may not be cordial. The Leelkase have been "fighting constantly with the Marehan in Gedo region. With regard to Leelkase relations with the Ogaden, there have been Leelkase "elements" in the Ogaden since the outbreak of the conflicts in Mogadishu. Having previously been in alliances against the Ogaden, the Leelkase relationship with the Ogadeni can be described as "tenuous at best".

Notable figures
 Abdirahman Hosh Jibril A.U.N Former minister of constitutional affairs.
 Khadra Bashir Ali Former Minister of Education of Federal Government of Somalia
 Duraan Ahmed Farah Former minister of labor, also former minister of transportation and civil aviation during President farmaajo.
 Ali Abdi Giir A somali author.
 Abdulkadir Abdi Hashi Former State for Planning and International Cooperation of Puntland, Former Minister of Education of Federal Government of Somalia
 Said Sheikh Samatar Prominent Somali scholar and writer.
 Sofia Samatar Somali-American educator, poet and writer. She is an assistant professor of English at James Madison University.
 A.U.N Shiikh Ahmed Haaji Abdirahman 
 Shiikh Ahmed Abdisamad co-founder of Al-ictisaam.
 Hassan Mohamed Faarah - Ayahle Former mayor of Goldogob Mudug Somalia.
 Abdisalam Aato Somali-American film director, producer, entrepreneur and media.
 Sadik Warfa Former Member of Somali Federal Parliament, Former Minister of Labour & Social Affairs of Federal Government of Somalia
 Zakaria Mohamed Haji-Abdi Former Member of Somali Federal Parliament.
 Abdirishiid Khalif Hashi analyst, former director of heritage institute, and former minister during farmajo tenure.
 Ali ismacil Abdi giir Politician.
 Farduus Osmaan Egaal Minister of Transport & Civil Aviation (MoTCA) of the Federal Government of Somalia.
 Naasir Ayaxle - Naasir Dheere Artist and comedian.
 Abdihakiin BR Comedian and TV Presenter.
 Sharmaake Hiil walaal Humanitarian.
 Maaria Abshir - Maariish Beauty Public Figure.

References

Darod
Somali clans in Ethiopia